Río Segundo is a district of the Alajuela canton, in the Alajuela province of Costa Rica.

Geography 
Río Segundo has an area of  km² and an elevation of  metres.

Demographics 

For the 2011 census, Río Segundo had a population of  inhabitants.

Transportation

Road transportation 
The district is covered by the following road routes:
 National Route 1
 National Route 3
 National Route 111
 National Route 119
 National Route 153

Rail transportation 
The Interurbano Line operated by Incofer goes through this district.

References 

Districts of Alajuela Province
Populated places in Alajuela Province